The violaceous jay (Cyanocorax violaceus) is a species of bird in the family Corvidae, the crows and their allies.

It is found in Bolivia, Brazil, Colombia, Ecuador, Guyana, Peru, and Venezuela. Its natural habitats are subtropical or tropical moist lowland forests and heavily degraded former forest. This species is mainly a lowland bird although locally this jay may variously range to elevations as high as 500–1,400 m.

Description

This is a medium-large jay with dull violet-blue plumage and a striking dark face and throat. The purplish jay (with which it overlaps in southeastern Peru and in northern Bolivia) is duller (more purplish or brownish blue, less violaceous blue) and the nape is not paler than the back. In eastern Colombia and southern Venezuela, the azure-naped jay is distinguished by its pale iris, white undertail coverts and tip to the tail, paler nape, and short frontal crest.

Behavior
The violaceous jay is omnivorous, mainly consuming fruits, insects, and bird and reptile eggs. It is also known to take small lizards as well.

Little is known in any detail about the violaceous jay's life history. Violaceous jays in Venezuela forage chiefly in the middle and upper canopy (above 18 meters) in a mature tropical evergreen rainforest. They take food items by hopping along limbs and gleaning for prey. It forages in flocks in forest canopy, and rarely lingers in one spot for long. These flocks often are noisy, but like other jays, the violaceous jay can be quiet and inconspicuous at times. They are known to frequently mob potential predators.

Distribution
The range of the violaceous jay is the southwest and northwest Amazon Basin, from northern Bolivia, through Amazonian eastern Peru and Ecuador, Amazonian Colombia, and the Orinoco River Basin and beyond into northern Venezuela. The range is east of the Andes cordillera, except in the north in Colombia and Venezuela. In southwest Guyana, (the southwest Guiana Shield), the range borders Roraima state, Brazil and the Amazon River, (Rio Negro), tributary, the south-flowing Branco River of central Roraima.

In Brazil's western Amazon Basin, the violaceous jay is found in Roraima, Amazonas, and Acre state, the west of North Region, Brazil.

References

External links
Violaceous jay videos on the Internet Bird Collection
Photo-474kb; Article photobirder–"Corvidae:Crows and Allies"

violaceous jay
Birds of the Amazon Basin
Birds of Colombia
Birds of Venezuela
Birds of the Ecuadorian Amazon
Birds of the Peruvian Amazon
violaceous jay
violaceous jay
Taxonomy articles created by Polbot